Idalia is an unincorporated town, a post office, and a census-designated place (CDP) located in Yuma County, Colorado, United States. The Idalia post office has the ZIP Code 80735. At the United States Census 2010, the population of the Idalia CDP was 88, while the population of the 80735 ZIP Code Tabulation Area was 405 including adjacent areas.

History
Idalia was founded in 1887. Located on the Eastern Plains of Colorado in southern Yuma County, approximately 150 miles east of Denver and 15 miles from the Kansas border, Idalia has been home for many generations of families.  The primary industries of the area are farming, ranching, and natural gas production.  The community has many amenities for a small rural community, including the Idalia Vision Foundation, Inc., two churches, local Co-Op, convenience store, restaurants, and a motel.  A new Kindergarten through grade-12 school building opened in the fall of 2013 providing state-of-the-art educational programs & facilities.

The Idalia Post Office has been in operation since 1888. The community derives its name from Edaliah Helmick, a pioneer settler.

Geography
Idalia is located along U.S. Highway 36 approximately two miles west of U.S. Highway 385.

Demographics

Idalia School
There is one school, Idalia School which teaches preschool through twelfth grade.  The school mascot is the wolf.  The town also has a preschool and daycare.

School Timeline 
 (1950)  Rex Dean McEwen is the first student to graduate from the Idalia school 
 (1970's) A high school wing was added to the preexisting school. 
 (1995) A new gymnasium is built 
 (2012-2013) The old school is completely torn down and a brand new school is built after the State of Colorado awards Idalia the BEST grant.

Idalia Vision Foundation, Inc. 
In 1992, the Idalia community formed the Idalia Vision Foundation, Inc., a 501(c)(4) tax-exempt non-profit organization.  The Vision Foundation was instrumental in the construction of the "new" gym built in 1995 and today helps support graduates from the Idalia High School with scholarship awards.

Idalia Days Celebration
Community members headed a project aimed at emulating the summer annual town celebrations of neighboring towns.  The event, Idalia Days, takes place each summer if enough interest is provided.  During its inaugural celebration, Idalia Days provided activities and events in which the community could partake.  Drawing on themes used in previous town celebrations, events include bed races, an old-time baseball game, old man six-man football, a melodrama illustrating the history of the towns relocation, a softball tournament, and a town dance, often featuring live music and food.

Idalia High School Sports Programs
Due to low enrollment of the high school, Idalia, like hundreds of schools throughout Kansas, Nebraska, Wyoming, Utah, and Texas, plays six-man football, a variation of football involving six players on each side off the ball rather than the traditional eleven. Idalia had a dominant program from the late 1990s into the 2000s, winning eight state titles between 1998 and 2010.  In recent years, the football program has struggled in the face of low-enrollment and as rival schools have consolidated sports programs in the wake of their own enrollment and budgetary constraints.

However, as the football program continues to rebuild, the Idalia girls' sports teams have had some very successful years.  In 2015, the Idalia girls' volleyball team advanced to the Colorado Class 1A volleyball championship match, ultimately falling to Otis High School in five sets.  In addition, the girls' basketball program won consecutive state championships in 2015 and 2016.

See also

Outline of Colorado
Index of Colorado-related articles
State of Colorado
Colorado cities and towns
Colorado census designated places
Colorado counties
Yuma County, Colorado

References

External links

Idalia @ Colorado.com
Idalia @ UncoverColorado.com
Idalia School District
Yuma County website

Census-designated places in Yuma County, Colorado
Census-designated places in Colorado
1887 establishments in Colorado